Le Tigre (French for "The Tiger") is an American electronic rock band formed by Kathleen Hanna (of Bikini Kill), Johanna Fateman and Sadie Benning in 1998 in New York City. Benning left in 2000 and was replaced by JD Samson for the rest of the group's existence. They mixed punk's directness and politics with playful samples, eclectic pop, and lo-fi electronics. The group also added multimedia and performance art elements to their live shows, which often featured support from like-minded acts such as the Need.

History

1998–2000: Formation and Le Tigre 
Following the breakup of Bikini Kill in 1998, Kathleen Hanna released a solo album under the pseudonym Julie Ruin and moved to New York, where she wanted to perform Julie Ruin songs live. Not wanting to perform the material alone, she recruited Johanna Fateman, whom Hanna had known since meeting at a Bikini Kill concert several years prior. Sadie Benning, who had helped Hanna make a music video for the Julie Ruin song "Aerobicide", also joined in order to help with visuals and translating the music into performable material. These performances never happened.

However, while Benning was still in Chicago, Hanna and Fateman began sharing cassettes between the three band members, with songs that would eventually become material for Le Tigre. They took their name from one of many hypothetical bands made up by Hanna circa 1994.

The band signed with Mr. Lady Records, who owners Hanna and Fateman met while they were in Portland, Oregon. Hanna called the signing "a logical choice" because of the label's greater political commitment over their music releases.

The band's first album, Le Tigre, was in October 1999. The band's original live performances consisted of Hanna, Fateman and Sadie performing music, along with JD Samson, a roadie they had met in September 1999, who manually operated a slideshow as a visual component to their music, as the band could not afford a projector at the time.

2000–2004: From The Desk of Mr. Lady EP and Feminist Sweepstakes 
In 2000, Benning left the band. As the band was already into a month-long tour, they asked Samson to fill in for them during live performances. The band had already been considering increasing the involvement of Samson as possibly a backup singer or dancer, so asked her to become an official member. Hanna remarked that "JD added an undeniable flair and charisma to the live show and took to touring and recording like a fish to water."

In October 2001, the band released their second album, Feminist Sweepstakes.

In 2003, Le Tigre collaborated with Chicks on Speed on their cover of Tom Tom Club's "Wordy Rappinghood" from their album 99 Cents along with other artists such as Miss Kittin, Kevin Blechdom, ADULT.'s Nicola Kuperus, and Tina Weymouth of Tom Tom Club. The cover became a moderate dance hit in Europe, peaking at number five on the Belgian Dance Chart, and at number sixty-six on the UK Singles Chart.

2004–2007: major label deal, This Island and hiatus 
In March 2004, Le Tigre signed with Strummer, a subsidiary of major label Universal Records, a move described by Kathleen Hanna as a make-or-break for the band, who were considering breaking up due to exhaustion.  In June 2004, Mr. Lady closed down, and the band began reissuing their back catalogue under their own label, Le Tigre Records, with distribution from Touch & Go Records.

They released their debut major-label album, This Island, in October 2004. The album was a moderate success, selling over 90,000 copies in the US.

The band entered a "long hiatus" in August 2007, due to the band being burnt out from touring This Island, and the band members wanting to "do their own thing".

2010–present: Brief reunions 
In 2010, Le Tigre briefly returned from a hiatus to produce Christina Aguilera's "My Girls", from her sixth studio album Bionic. The track features Peaches.

Le Tigre members JD Samson and Johanna Fateman collaborated with Russian activists Pussy Riot during a concert organised by Vice (magazine) in 2014, performing Le Tigre's “Deceptacon”. Later, in 2015, they reunited with Pussy Riot to record a song and video for Netflix series House of Cards.

In September 2016, the band announced they were reuniting just to release a "special song". On October 19, 2016, Le Tigre released the song, titled "I'm With Her", and its accompanying video to voice their support of the 2016 Democratic presidential nominee, Hillary Clinton.

In December 2021, the band announced they would be getting together to play at This Ain't No Picnic Festival in 2022.

In January 2023, the band announced they would be reuniting for the first tour in eighteen years.

Controversies

Involvement in Michigan Womyn's Music Festival 
Le Tigre, along with several acts from Mr. Lady, played at the Michigan Womyn's Music Festival in 2001 and 2005. This festival became controversial for its "womyn-born womyn" stance and exclusion of trans women from the festival, leading critics to believe that Mr. Lady and Le Tigre were transphobic. Several acts from the label, including Le Tigre and The Butchies, received verbal harassment and death threats as a result of playing at the 2001 festival.

In 2014, amid a boycott of the festival led by Equality Michigan, a group of fans dropped a banner that read "Apologise for Michigan" at a Julie Ruin concert at the Mod Club, Toronto, calling for Hanna to apologise for their performances at the festival. JD Samson released a statement in response, announcing her boycott of the festival until all self-identified women were included. The festival shut down in 2015. Hanna has not directly addressed their participation in the festival, but in 2018 has said on Twitter that she supports trans rights.

Deceptacon copyright lawsuit 
In October 2021, Hanna and Fateman countersued singer-songwriter Barry Mann, who sent the band cease-and-desist letters after claiming the song "Deceptacon" was copyright infringing on his song "Who Put the Bomp (in the Bomp, Bomp, Bomp)". Hanna and Fateman argued that the use of "bomp" was transformative of the song, as a critique of Mann's song. They settled the case in November 2021, with the dispute “amicably resolved by a confidential settlement agreement without any public admission of liability”, according to Pitchfork.

Band members 

Current members
 Kathleen Hanna (1998–2007, 2010, 2016, 2022)
 Johanna Fateman (1998–2007, 2010, 2016, 2022)
 JD Samson (2000–2007, 2010, 2016, 2022)
Former members
 Sadie Benning  (1998–2000)

Discography 

 Le Tigre (1999)
 Feminist Sweepstakes (2001)
This Island (2004)

References

External links
 Official website
 
 
 

All-female punk bands
Dance-punk musical groups
Musical groups established in 1998
Musical groups disestablished in 2007
Musical groups reestablished in 2010
Musical groups disestablished in 2010
Musical groups reestablished in 2016
Musical groups disestablished in 2016
Electroclash groups
Electronic music groups from New York (state)
Feminist musicians
LGBT-themed musical groups
Musical groups from New York City
Post-punk revival music groups
Universal Records artists
American electronic rock musical groups
Riot grrrl bands
American women in electronic music